(English: Tithonus and Aurora) is an opera in three acts and a prologue by the French composer Jean-Joseph de Mondonville which was first performed at the Académie royale de musique in Paris on 9 January 1753. The authorship of the libretto has been subject to debate;  Mondonville's contemporaries ascribed the prologue to Antoine Houdar de la Motte and the three acts of the opera to the Abbé de La Marre. Titon et l'Aurore belongs to the genre known as the pastorale héroïque. The work played an important role in the so-called Querelle des Bouffons, a dispute over the relative merits of the French and Italian operatic traditions which dominated the intellectual life of Paris in the early 1750s. The tremendous success of Mondonville's opera at its premiere was an important victory for the French camp (although their Italian rivals claimed that this was because they had been excluded from their seats by members of the army). Titon was one of Mondonville's most popular works and went on to enjoy several revivals during his lifetime.

Roles

Synopsis
Prologue Promethée (Prometheus) has stolen fire from heaven to give life to his statues. L'Amour (Cupid) teaches them about the delights of love.
Act One Titon (Tithonus), a mortal shepherd, is in love with Aurore (Aurora), the goddess of the dawn. He awaits her and when she arrives the two sing of their love for each other. This arouses the jealousy of Eole (Aeolus), the god of the winds, who is in love with Aurore. Palès (Pales), the goddess of shepherds, flocks and livestock, is also in love with Titon and asks Eole to be allowed to deal with him.
Act Two Aurore rejects Eole's advances, saying she would rather lose her immortality than the love of Titon. Palès is also unsuccessful in her wooing of Titon and her love turns to anger.
Act Three Palès curses Titon with premature old age. Nevertheless Aurore remains faithful to him and L'Amour saves the day by reversing the spell.

Recordings
Titon et l'Aurore Jean-Paul Fouchécourt, Catherine Napoli, Philippe Huttenlocher, Les Musiciens du Louvre, conducted by Marc Minkowski (Erato, 1992)

References
Notes

Sources
 Original libretto: Titon et l'Aurore, Pastorale Héroïque, Représentée pour la Première Fois, par l'Académie Royale de Musique, Le Mardi neuf Janvier 1753, Paris, Delormel, 1753 (accessibile gratuitamente online at Internet Archive)
 Period printed score: Titon et l'Aurore, Pastorale Héroïque Dediée À Monseigneur le Prince de Soubise Mise en Musique par Monsieur Mondonville  (Œvre VIIIe), Paris Chez l'Auteur, s.d. (accessibile for free online at Gallica - Bibliothèque Nationale de France)
 Booklet notes to the Minkowski recording

French-language operas
Operas by Jean-Joseph Cassanéa de Mondonville
1753 operas
Operas
Aurora (mythology)
Operas based on classical mythology